Story of My Life is Pere Ubu's ninth studio album.  Eric Drew Feldman left the band prior to recording, reducing Ubu to a quartet.  Prior to touring on this album longtime bassist Tony Maimone left as well. This is the final release to feature both Maimome and founding drummer Scott Krauss.  According to a conversation between David Thomas and Frank Black included on the b-side of the "Kathleen" single, the album's working title was Johnny Rivers Live At The Whiskey A Go Go.

Though out of print for many years, a reissue was announced in early 2007.

"Come Home" features prominently in a bar fight scene in Kalifornia (1993), starring Brad Pitt as a psychopathic serial killer.

"Wasted" appears in Sleep with Me (1994), starring Meg Tilly, Eric Stoltz and Craig Sheffer.

Track listing
"Wasted"  – 2:37
"Come Home"  – 4:49
"Louisiana Train Wreck"  – 3:20
"Fedora Satellite II"  – 3:26
"Heartbreak Garage"  – 3:52
"Postcard"  – 2:49
"Kathleen"  – 4:24
"Honey Moon"  – 2:54
"Sleep Walk"  – 4:23
"The Story of My Life"  – 4:06
"Last Will & Testament"  – 3:48

Personnel
Pere Ubu
David Thomas - vocals, melodeon, guitar on "Postcard"
Jim Jones - guitar, Hammond B3, backing vox, keyboard
Tony Maimone - bass, EML synthesizer
Scott Krauss - drums, percussion, keyboard, shortwave
with:
Al Clay - vox calliope, digital keyboard, backing vocals, guitar on "Postcard"

References 

Pere Ubu albums
1993 albums
Fontana Records albums